Fantasy Man is a 1984 Australian film about a man who has a mid life crisis and has fantasies.

Cast
Harold Hopkins as Nick Bailey 
Jeanie Drynan as Liz Bailey 
Kerry Mack as Donna 
Kate Fitzpatrick as Neighbor 
John Howitt as Howard

References

External links
Fantasy Man at IMDb
Fantasy Man at Peter Malone
Fantasy Man at TCMDB
Fantasy Man at Screen Australia

Australian drama films
1980s English-language films
1980s Australian films